Sthenoprocris malgassica is a species of moth of the family Zygaenidae. It is known from Madagascar.

References

Procridinae
Moths described in 1920
Moths of Madagascar
Moths of Africa